The Evening Post was a London newspaper published from 1710 until February 1732, not to be confused with the London Evening Post.

The paper was printed by E. Berington in Silver Street, Bloomsbury, and sold by John Morphew near Stationers-Hall.

The paper was then published as Berington's Evening Post from 8 February 1732 until 29 August 1740.

See also 
 Burney Collection of Newspapers

References

Defunct newspapers published in the United Kingdom
Publications established in 1710
Publications disestablished in 1740
Newspapers published in London
1710 establishments in England